Greentech could refer to:

 Cleantech
 Green technology, also called environmental technology
 GreenTech ITM, a U.S.-based company that creates modular turf systems
 GreenTech Automotive, a U.S.-based "green" automobile manufacturer